Khandar is a town and tehsil in district Sawai Madhopur, Rajasthan. The river Banas flows through Khandar.

History 
Khandar was famous for the ancient Khandar Fort. Earlier it was the part of Ranthambhore. Following the Independence of India it became part of Rajasthan

Geography

Demography
More than 70% of the population is literate.  Hindi is the official language.

Economy
The main livelihood is agriculture. The sources of water are open wells and tube wells.

Places of interest
The Rameshwaram Temple is 20 km from Khandar on the confluence of the Banas, Seep and Chambal rivers. There is a beautiful temple to Lord Chaturbhuj Nathji. There is also a Shiva temple on the ghat of Chambal river, which is a very old monument, but  it is collapsing due to lack of care.

A famous yearly mela (fair) is organized a fortnight after Deepawli on next Poornima. Many thousands of people gather here in this fair from the Sawai Madhopur, Kota, Baaran districts of Rajasthan and from Sheopur district of Madhya Pradesh. As there a very large number of religious activities in Khandar pargana (local territory), such as Geetabhawan Satsangmandals, Akhand Keertan and Ramayan Paath, Khandar there has been continuous activity in Khandar for many years. People got their inspiration for these activities from the famous divine Brahmeen Mahatma Shri Krishnanandji.

See also
Khandar Fort
Ranthambore National Park
There also is a fort here named 'Taragrah'. A famous temple "Shri Ji Mandir" is situated at the heart of Khandar.

Other attractions 
Rameshwar Dwar: A temple is dedicated to Lord Shiva. It has huge block on multi-angular pillars. People visit in crowds during Deepawali to see the annual fair.

Shivalaya Temple: Another temple to Lord Shiva, built in Persian and Nagara style on the banks of the river Banas.

Banipura Balaji:  This is an attraction point for all followers of Lord Hanuman. This place attracts a crowd because of its natural surroundings.

Gilai Sagar:  This dam is situated near the town. In the rainy season, it is full of water. There are many gharial crocodiles in the dam, which attracts visitors.

References

External links
Rajasthan Tourism

Villages in Sawai Madhopur district